António José dos Santos Folha (born 21 May 1971) is a Portuguese retired professional footballer who played mostly as a winger, currently manager of FC Porto B.

He amassed Primeira Liga totals of 227 matches and 22 goals over 12 seasons, mainly in representation of Porto. He also appeared in the competition with Gil Vicente and Braga, and was part of the Portugal squad at Euro 1996.

Folha worked as a manager after retiring, starting out at Porto B before joining Portimonense in 2018.

Club career
Folha was born in Vila Nova de Gaia, Porto District. In his career he played mostly for FC Porto, with loan stints in Portugal, Belgium and Greece, being often used as a substitute by his main club where he won a total of 18 major titles (including seven Primeira Liga trophies and five Taça de Portugal). From 1994 to 1996, he had his best years with the team, contributing ten goals in 58 games as they won back-to-back national championships.

At the end of the 2002–03 season, aged 32, Folha was finally released by Porto and joined F.C. Penafiel of the Segunda Liga, helping to a return to the top flight in his first year. He retired from football in 2005, and joined his last team's coaching staff immediately afterwards, also serving a two-season stint as assistant manager, one in each of the major levels.

Folha returned to Porto once again in 2008, being named assistant with the junior side and remaining in the position for several seasons. Later, he coached the reserves.

In June 2018, Folha replaced the departed Vítor Oliveira at the helm of top-division club Portimonense SC. He finished 12th in his first season on the Algarve, and resigned on 18 January 2020 when second from bottom having lost to last-placed C.D. Aves.

Folha returned to Porto B on 2 February 2021, taking over from Rui Barros – who had succeeded him – at the last-placed side in the second tier. He secured their survival in the last matchday.

International career
Folha earned 26 caps for Portugal over a three-year period, and was selected for the UEFA Euro 1996 tournament, appearing in three matches in an eventual quarter-final exit and assisting Ricardo Sá Pinto in the 1–1 group stage draw against Denmark.

Previously, he helped the under-20 team to win the 1989 FIFA World Youth Championship in Saudi Arabia.

Personal life
Folha's son, Bernardo, is also a footballer. A midfielder, he was also developed at Porto, being coached at the reserve team by his father.

Career statistics

Club

International goals
Scores and results list Portugal's goal tally first, score column indicates score after each Folha goal.

Managerial statistics

Honours
Porto
Primeira Divisão: 1991–92, 1994–95, 1995–96, 1996–97, 1997–98, 1998–99
Taça de Portugal: 1993–94, 1997–98, 1999–00, 2000–01
Supertaça Cândido de Oliveira: 1991, 1993, 1994, 1998

AEK Athens
Greek Football Cup: 2001–02

Portugal U20
FIFA World Youth Championship: 1989

References

External links

1971 births
Living people
Sportspeople from Vila Nova de Gaia
Portuguese footballers
Association football wingers
Primeira Liga players
Liga Portugal 2 players
FC Porto players
Gil Vicente F.C. players
S.C. Braga players
F.C. Penafiel players
Belgian Pro League players
Standard Liège players
Super League Greece players
AEK Athens F.C. players
Portugal youth international footballers
Portugal under-21 international footballers
Portugal international footballers
UEFA Euro 1996 players
Portuguese expatriate footballers
Expatriate footballers in Belgium
Expatriate footballers in Greece
Portuguese expatriate sportspeople in Belgium
Portuguese expatriate sportspeople in Greece
Portuguese football managers
Primeira Liga managers
Liga Portugal 2 managers
FC Porto B managers
Portimonense S.C. managers
FC Porto non-playing staff